Plätlinsee is a lake in the Mecklenburgische Seenplatte district in Mecklenburg-Vorpommern, Germany. At an elevation of 55.1 m, its surface area is 2.42 km2.

Lakes of Mecklenburg-Western Pomerania